This company originally traded as Pete's Travel, and has also traded as People's Express

Probus Management was a bus company in the West Midlands which was acquired by the Go-Ahead Group in March 2006.

History
Probus Management commenced operating on 4 May 1993 trading as Pete's Travel with two Dodge minibuses on route 404 between Walsall and West Bromwich.

The operation of route 79, between Birmingham, West Bromwich and Wolverhampton, increased the size of the fleet to six by the end of the year. All the vehicles were painted in a white livery with a black skirt, and red fleet names. Pictured

Purchase of Lionspeed and gain of Centro contracts
In May 1994, Pete's acquired Lionspeed, who was a minibus operator based in Erdington, running a mix of commercial and Centro supported services in north Birmingham.

The company successfully gained the right to run its own Centro contracts in October 1994, and by February 1995 it had 25 minibuses in operation, mostly second-hand Dodge minibuses.

Pete's moved to a new depot in Church Lane Industrial Estate in May 1996, where 50 minibuses could be parked under cover. At the same time Lionspeed's yellow and green livery was adopted, and the company bought its first new buses in the shape of Mercedes-Benz minibuses, which were operated under a separate company called The Busy Bus Company.

In October 1996, the company won more Centro contracts and additional vehicles were needed. Pete's wanted six Mercedes-Benz Varios but could not obtain enough in time, so other bus types were operated, including a Dennis Dart SLF. The popularity of these buses led to Pete's purchasing another three in June 1997.

Pete's Travel took over further Centro contracts, with Dodge minibuses, in January 1997, after The Little Red Bus Company went into receivership.

Purchase of People's Express
In May 1997, the company acquired a 50% stake in People's Express, who at the time operated 13 buses, also in West Bromwich. The remainder of People's Express was purchased in June 1998, along with the company's Centro contracts. Following more contract wins at the end of 1998, the company expanded into Coventry, Telford and Bridgnorth.

Move to Hill Top and Redditch
A new depot was purchased in February of that year, at "Hill Top" in West Bromwich, allowing the use of double deckers for Centro school contracts.

In October 2001, two new depots were established, one in Coventry for newly won Centro and Warwickshire County Council contracts, and another in Redditch for Centro and Worcestershire County Council contracts, and some commercial services following First Wyvern's staff shortage service cuts.

Rise and decline of the Telford operations
In February 2002, the Britannia Travel of Telford business was purchased, which was used to expand operations in Shropshire and to start a coach operation. The Telford depot was closed in late 2004 due to the extensive loss of Shropshire contracts.

People's Express name revived
On 28 March 2005, the company changed its trading name from Pete's Travel to People's Express. On 17 June 2005, People's Express closed the Redditch depot. From that date all services were operated from the West Bromwich depot.

Go-Ahead
On 21 March 2006, Probus Management was purchased by the Go-Ahead Group and integrated into its Go West Midlands operation with the People's Express name dropped from use.

In March 2008, Go West Midlands was sold to Rotala and is now part of Diamond Bus.

Fleet

Pete's Travel commenced services with two Dodge S56 minibuses - Alexander bodied D821RYS and Reeve Burgess bodied D126OWG. The S56 minibuses became the mainstay of operations, with considerable secondhand models emanating from South Yorkshire and Greater Manchester, the latter with Northern Counties bodies. Further additions came from the collapse of Little Red Bus all repainted into the green/yellow livery. Unique purchases for the fleet came in high bodied D-NUH Dodge Commander buses from Islwyn Transport in South Wales.

Following the acquisition of Lionspeed, the fleet saw additions of Freight Rover Sherpa/Carlyle body and the start of The Busy Bus Company brought the group's first new vehicles in Mercedes/Mellor body midibuses. As the group won more Centro tenders, then newer vehicles were required in the shape of Mercedes Varios from Cheshire Bus & Coach. CBC were unable to fulfil the full delivery of Varios so offered Pete's the first full sized single decker bus in the form of new low floor Dennis Dart with Wright Crusader body, much to the disgust of the region's largest operator and Pete's main rival, Travel West Midlands, who themselves were only recently taking delivery of low floor buses. Pete's added more darts to fleet with East Lancashire and, the ubiquitous, Plaxton Pointer bodies, all in various lengths from the Mini Pointer to the Super Pointer bodies. Pete's did acquire a small number of step-entrance Plaxton Pointer, Alexander and Wright Handybus split screen bodies to replace ageing Dodge S56s and a steady fleet upgrade continued well into the late 1990s. Notable purchases came from very early Duple Dartline and Carlyle bodied darts from London Buses with the sweeping curved windscreens, though one of the more unusual Dennis Dart purchases came from non-standard UVG bodied R810WJA.

More contracts ensued with the requirement of high capacity double deckers for school work - Pete's acquired a number of MCW Metrobuses from London Buses operating units, some with both double door and single door conversions. Further London vehicles bolstered the fleet in Volvo Citybus/Northern Counties.

At the time of the sale to Go-Ahead in March 2006, the fleet composed of 115 buses and coaches.

References

1993 establishments in England
2006 disestablishments in England
Former bus operators in the West Midlands (county)